Santia Josette Omara Bradshaw (born 13 March 1976) is a Barbadian politician. She is a cabinet minister in the cabinet of Mia Mottley. Bradshaw is the deputy prime minister of Barbados.

Early life and career 
Santia Josette Omara Bradshaw was born on 13 March 1976.. She studied Law at the University of Huddersfield. Afterwards she worked as a lawyer in Barbados before entering politics. 

In 2010, she was appointed by the leader of the Opposition to take a seat in the Senate of Barbados. On 9 November 2010, she was sworn in to office. In February 2013, she was elected to the Barbados House of Assembly representing Saint Michael South-East constituency. Between 2006 and 2008, she was an Honorary Secretary of the Barbados Bar Association. On 24 May 2018, after the 2018 general elections, she retained her seat as a member of the House of Assembly of Barbados and was appointed Minister of Education, Technological and Vocational Training.

In March 2020, she was appointed acting prime minister of Barbados after Mia Mottley was on leave for medical procedures.

Bradshaw was named deputy prime minister by Mia Mottley in January 2022 and was officially sworn in on the 26 January 2022. She was the first officially named deputy prime minister of Barbados since Freundel Stuart 12 years prior.

References 

1976 births
Living people
Barbadian politicians
Deputy Prime Ministers of Barbados
Barbados Labour Party politicians
Barbadian women
Government ministers of Barbados
Members of the House of Assembly of Barbados